Wielowieś  is a village in the administrative district of Gmina Wielowieś, within Gliwice County, Silesian Voivodeship, in south Poland.

The village has a population of 1,811.

External links 
 Jewish Community in Wielowieś on Virtual Shtetl

References

Villages in Gliwice County